Deshaies is a French surname.  Notable people with this name include:

Arthur Deshaies (1920–2011), American printmaker and painter
Bernard Deshaies (born 1953), Canadian politician
Brodie Deshaies (born 1999), American politician
Jim Deshaies (born 1960), American baseball pitcher and television broadcaster
Josée Deshaies, French-Canadian cinematographer
Raymond J. Deshaies (born 1961), American biochemist

See also
Deshaies, a commune in Guadeloupe, French Caribbean
Deshayes (surname)
Brandun DeShay (born 1990), American rapper

French-language surnames